Music for Violin Alone is an album by violinist Mark Feldman which was released on the Tzadik label in 1995.

Reception

In her review for Allmusic, Joslyn Layne notes that "Music for Violin Alone is the debut date as leader for virtuoso violinist Mark Feldman, who has performed as a sideman with countless musicians, in genres ranging from country to avant-garde jazz. Here he performs original, classically styled pieces that exude high drama". On All About Jazz Karla Cornejo Villavincencio said "The whole record is dedicated to the solo violin and the attention is well-deserved, Feldman's playing easily keeping the listener enraptured".

Track listing
All compositions by Mark Feldman
 "Etude" - 2:18  
 "Jeté" - 8:52  
 "Calista" - 5:52  
 "Sul G" - 1:57  
 "Molly" - 1:33  
 "Caprice" - 1:49  
 "Fantasy for the Violin" - 5:32  
 "Elergy" - 6:37  
 "Stalker" - 2:03  
 "The Tri Five" - 2:35  
 "4 Spiker" - 4:01

Personnel
Mark Feldman - violin

References 

Tzadik Records albums
Mark Feldman albums
1995 albums